William Pelham (1759–1827) was a bookseller and publisher in Boston, Massachusetts, in the late 18th and early 19th centuries. He kept a shop and circulating subscription library at no.59 Cornhill, 1796-1810.

Biography
Pelham was born in Williamsburg, Virginia in 1759, to Peter Pelham, Jr. and Ann Creese. William's grandfather was Peter Pelham, the Boston artist.

William Pelham was working in the book trade in Boston by the 1790s. "In the Independent Chronicle for July 7, 1796, Pelham offered for sale new books and 'an uncommonly fine proof of Mr. Copley's celebrated plate of the Death of Chatham.'"

In his bookshop Pelham also operated a circulating library.  The 1801 catalog of Pelham's Circulating Library included several hundred titles, including, for example:

 Adela Northington
 Belmont Grove; or the discovery
 Belleville Lodge; a novel
 Female Jockey Club
 Hackney Coach; a sentimental miscellany
 Hive; or repository of sententious essays
 Inside View of the Prisons of Paris
 Hawkins' Letters on the Female Mind
 Looker-On; a periodical work
 Management of the Tongue
 Manual of Liberty
 Mirabeau's Gallery of Portraits
 Mavor's Collection of Voyages and Travels
 Museum of Agreeable Entertainment 
 New Foundling Hospital for Wit
 Parker's View of High, and Low Life
 Peruvian Letters
 Reign of George VI Anticipated
 Tooke's Pantheon of the Heathen Deities
 Trimmer's Introduction to the Knowledge of Nature
 Mortimer's Universal Director
 Universal Story-Teller

Pelham's nephew William Blagrove took over the library in 1804, moving it to School Street, and continuing to oversee the enterprise until 1811.

In 1805 Pelham published The Elements of Chess, "one of the earliest works upon chess published in the United States, and the first of its kind printed at Boston. The editor of this volume — (that the book was edited by some chessplayer at the time of its publication is apparent from an exceedingly interesting appendix, containing much new and original matter) — was undoubtedly a nephew of Mr. Pelham's, named William Blagrove, who is known to have been an enthusiast of chess, and a player of merit."

In 1808 he wrote and published A System of Notation, a pronunciation manual for English language. It incorporated "a new edition of a popular English novel, for the purpose of introducing A New System Of Notation; by which the variable sounds of the vowels and consonants in the English alphabet may be accurately distinguished. The irregularity of sound to which many of our alphabetical characters are subject, has been frequently noticed and complained of: more especially by foreigners engaged in learning the language. ... The marks denoting sounds will be on the left hand page; the right hand page will contain the same matter, word for word, the marks of sound being omitted, and the accent distinguished."

From his aunt Sarah Creese, Pelham inherited "the estate, no.59 Cornhill, [in Boston], which her uncle, Rev. Wm. Price had given King's Chapel. ... In 1813 the wardens of King's Chapel sued Pelham and recovered the estate from him."

Some time after 1810 he moved to Zanesville, Ohio. He died in New Harmony, Indiana, in 1827.

References

Further reading

Works written/published by Pelham
 The Elements of Chess, a Treatise combining Theory with Practice, and comprising the whole of Philidor's Games and explanatory Notes, new modelled and arranged upon an original Plan. Boston: Wm. Pelham, 1805. Google books.
 An important and luminous communication on the subject of the impressment of American and foreign seamen and other persons. The treaty referred to was negotiated in London during 1806 by Monroe and William Pinkney, and rejected by President Jefferson in 1807. Boston: Published and sold by William Pelham, no. 59, Cornhill. Munroe & Francis, printers, 1808.
 William Pelham. A system of notation : representing the sounds of alphabetical characters by a new application of the accentual marks in present use : with such additions as were necessary to supply deficiencies. Boston: Printed for W. Pelham, 1808.
 Catalogue of juvenile books and literary toys for sale by William Pelham, no. 59, Cornhill, Boston. 1810

Works about Pelham
 Charles K. Bolton. Circulating libraries in Boston, 1765-1865. Publications of the Colonial Society of Massachusetts, Volume 11. Feb. 1907.

External links
 WorldCat. W. Pelham
 Working Men's Institute. Pelham Collection
 http://www.gallantpelham.org/articles/showart.cfm?id_art=74

1759 births
1827 deaths
Businesspeople from Boston
19th century in Boston
American publishers (people)